The Pau–Canfranc railway is a partially-closed  long international single-track standard gauge railway line connecting Pau in the Pyrénées-Atlantiques region of France, climbing via the Gave d'Aspe valley and tunneling under the Pyrenees, to Canfranc in Spain. The line is part of transport infrastructure between (Toulouse or) Bordeaux and Zaragoza and is now named the Goya Line, after the painter Francisco de Goya who was born near Zaragoza and died in Bordeaux.

Opened and electrified in 1928, it was closed south of Bedous, France, after a major derailment accident on 27 March 1970, which destroyed the L'Estanguet bridge south of Accous. North of Bedous, the line was closed up to Oloron-Sainte-Marie to passengers on 30 May 1980, although it remained open for freight traffic until 1985. In August 2014, the French state railway company SNCF began work on a project to reopen this section, which happened on 1 July 2016.

Connecting buses run from Bedous to Canfranc, and trains still run on the Spanish side from Canfranc International Railway Station, departing south to Jaca and Zaragoza.

History

Proposal to build - France
The legal title to build the Pau to Oloron-Sainte-Marie section was given to the Chemins de fer du Midi on signing of a memorandum  between the company and the Minister of Agriculture, Trade and Public Works on 10 August 1868. The agreement was approved by an imperial decree on the same date, and declared a public utility and definitively granted by a law on 23 March 1874. After completing construction, this section came into operation in 1883.

On 17 July 1879 a law was passed (the Freycinet plan, covering 181 ranking railway lines of general interest. No.178 was a line from "Oloron in Bedous (Lower Pyrenees)", and further a line from "Oloron to Puyoô in Saint-Palais, by the Gave Oloron Valley". Subsequently, on 17 July 1886 No.179 was legally titled to the Chemins de fer du Midi by a separate law. The Oloron to Bedous section was declared a public utility, with the concession confirmed on 27 June 1897; the latter proposed section to Puyoô was never built, cancelled by a law on 8 July 1900.

International section
The international section from Bedous into Spain was the subject of an international convention between France and Spain signed on 18 August 1904. Approved by a French law on 10 January 1907 and promulgated by a decree on 6 February 1907, the concession to build was granted to the Chemins de fer du Midi after an agreement with the Minister of Public Works was signed on 20 June 1907, and declared a public utility by a law 2 August 1907.

The Franco-Spanish convention was amended by a protocol signed on 15 April 1908, which provided that the required Somport tunnel would be equipped with a  track, the gauge on the French side, and that the Spanish government would fund a suitable gauge interchange station on their side. The protocol was enacted by a decree on 25 January 1909.

Construction of the Somport tunnel was inaugurated on 12 July 1912, and after delays in its construction due to World War I, completed in 1915. Spanish project engineer Ramírez de Dampierre began construction of the Canfranc International Railway Station in 1923, and it was formally opened on 18 July 1928, in the presence of King Alfonso XIII of Spain and the president of the French Republic Gaston Doumergue.

Operations
On full opening, the line converted immediately to overhead line electrification at 1500 V DC. The line was built to  gauge, but on connecting to the Iberian gauge track at Canfranc, the large station there allowed for suitable interchange facilities.

From Pau, France, the line follows the Gave d'Aspe valley southward, reaching Bedous (altitude ) in relatively flat terrain. To reach this point from Bedous, the steeply climbing line both traverses sharp curves and passes through 14 tunnels including the spiral tunnel at Forges-d'Abel.

Due to the Franco-Spanish international convention under which it was built, the Somport tunnel and quasi-French control of the French-side of Canfranc international railway station continued during World War II. The Spanish authorities came to an operational agreement with the German Nazi Wehrmacht authorities whereby passenger train services continued, and freight trains carried mined tungsten north and French grain plus trans-shipped Swiss gold south.

Closure
On 20 March 1970, a nine-car train carrying corn left Pau for Canfranc (where there is still a large regional grain terminal), headed by two SNCF BB Midi locomotives, No.4227 and 4235. Having passed the station at Lescun Cette-Eygun, they started to climb the Aspe valley towards Etsaut and Urdos. This was early morning and the tracks were iced due to the humid cold, causing wheel slippage while on the steep 4.3% climb. The train came to a stop. Both locomotives' sandboxes were empty, and the engineers decided to dispense pebbles on the rails instead. They set both locomotives on rheostatic braking and climbed down from the cabin. However, the electrical substation at Urdos supplying power to the line was not working, resulting in the line voltage to be 900 volts DC instead of the nominal 1500 volts; as a result, the Bedous substation breakers tripped, leaving the unmanned train to freewheel backwards down the line. On reaching the bridge over Estanguet river (km 280) at such a speed, the resulting movement of the cars caused them to come off the track. The first car consequently hit the bridge and derailed the whole train, destroying the bridge. No one was killed or injured in the accident.

The accident, occurring two weeks before Good Friday, resulted in the railway service being replaced on a temporary basis with connecting buses from Bedous. Although the bridge was replaceable, the SNCF, with major operating and balance sheet debts, argued against replacement, and hence terminated service to Bedous.

During the construction of the Somport road tunnel, 17 passageways were cut into the railway tunnel to allow for escape should a fire ever break out when traffic is going through the tunnel.

Stations
The main stations on the line are:

Note: The origin of PK is in Toulouse

Renovation and reopening
In present economic development, the transport route beneath the Aspe peak via the Gave d'Aspe valley is changing from a relatively unused route into a major transport channel. This is due not only to the regional pressure between Bordeaux and Zaragoza (which on the Spanish side alone has a regional population of 1 million people), but also to the importance of the international route between Paris and Valencia. These economic pressures - in part driven by the General Motors (later PSA) plant located in Zaragoza - have in recent years resulted in heavy truck and car traffic on the roads of the upper Gave d'Aspe valley, and an increased number of accidents.

As a result, the French government placed pressure on SNCF to reopen the route to at least Bedous to allow the safe opening of the upper valley to tourists and also to service regional passenger traffic. This would then allow due economic discussion to take place between the French and Spanish governments over opening the residual section to Canfranc, something which SNCF considers not in best modern operational interests, taking into account the loading gauge restrictions of the helical tunnel at Forges-d'Abel.

In May 2008, following a landslide on the RN 134 in January 2008 and the resultant need to use the Sens tunnel near Etsaut, President of the Aquitaine region Alain Rousset invited SNCF President Guillaume Pepy to the line, during which Pepy agreed in principle to support reopening the line.

Pau to Oloron-Sainte-Marie

In September 2008, the major electrical substation which supplied power on the Pau to Oloron-Sainte-Marie section was turned off and removed to permit the commercial expansion of an industrial estate. In September 2010, the line was closed for six months to allow major works to be undertaken, both to the infrastructure and environment. The entire line infrastructure, including all ballast and the redundant Midi catenary, was removed, the roadways cleared and new drainage built. Then new ballast and lines were installed, laid out to allow later possible electrification. Finally, TER Aquitaine replaced the previously used SNCF Class X 2200 railcar units with modern SNCF Class X 73500.

Agreement to reopen to Canfranc
Since the mid-2000s, the Aquitaine region has supported the line's reopening. On 15 March 2013 Alain Rousset (President of the Aquitaine region) and Luisa Fernanda Rudi Ubeda (President of the Government of Aragon) signed a Memorandum of Understanding for a plan of cross-border cooperation up until 2020. The memorandum sets a timetable for reopening of the line in two phases, the Oloron section to Bedous in 2015, then the Bedous section across the border to Canfranc in 2020. Subsequently, the Autonomous Community of Aragon acquired the Canfranc station from RENFE with a plan to restore and develop it as a catalyst (tourism, academic, economic) for the region.

After signing the memorandum, the Aquitaine Regional Council (ARC) commissioned SNCF to undertake preliminary studies on opening the  section from Oloron-Sainte-Marie to Bedous, and to survey the whole line to Canfranc. The study found that all tunnels on the line were in good condition, except for the sidewall of Peilhou tunnel that had collapsed. Similarly, the bridges are still in place, except south of Bedous towards Canfranc, where there are three major areas of work required:
Estanguet bridge, destroyed by the 1970 accident
Bigue bridge over the river Aspe, south of Accous. The bridge was destroyed by a flood on 5 October 1992. Since then, the building of the RN 134 bypass road from Bedous and Accous (which cost EUR 41.66 million) has also removed the approach infrastructure
Peilhou and Serbers viaducts. During the construction of the RN 134, retaining the viaducts would have created too sharp a curve on the road. Consequently, it was agreed to keep both viaducts intact but remove one approach embankment of each viaduct, to enable the creation of a wider road.

Despite an unfavorable opinion from both the public enquiry and the Commission of Inquiry, ARC declared the project a public utility by the signing of the decree on 19 February 2014.

Reopening of Oloron-Sainte-Marie to Bedous
SNCF were commissioned by ARC to undertake full costings and present a project plan for the reopening of the Oloron-Sainte-Marie to Bedous section. The SNCF reported that substantial work was required, including the replacement of 12 bridge decks, rebuilding of all road crossings to modern unmanned standards, and full renovation of all stations. Further, SNCF stated the requirement of modern landslide protection along the line. The ARC announced that the project was valued €122M, with €100M coming from ARC's budget and a minimum of €30M coming from other sources, mainly the French government and EU grants.

Following delays in agreement on budget funding, SNCF began work on 26 September 2014 with a projected opening to Bedous by March 2016. In a replication of the project to renovate the Pau to Oloron-Sainte-Marie section, the project included removal of all line infrastructure; renovation of all earthworks and bridges; removal of two road crossings and renovation of all other crossings to modern unmanned standards; installation of the required landslide protection and matts; and then track re-laying with new ballast, concrete sleepers and steel rails.

SNCF proposed installation of Automatic Block restricted permissiveness signalling between Oloron and Bedous. There are three sections: Bidos, Lurbe-Saint-Christau and Bedous.

Canfranc station/hotel and railway current status (2022)

Limiting Canfranc station to its former freight part was completed in April 2021, changing the former track fields around the station building into a park and a road to access the buildings by the end of 2022. The hotel opens towards the end of January 2023, all the Spanish track is being equipped with sleepers convertible to standard gauge, and "with EU support it is hoped that the Canfranc line and station will be fully operational by 2026".

See also 
 Canfranc Underground Laboratory

References

External links 

The International Train Station of Canfranc, photographs and history

Railway lines in Spain
Railway lines in Nouvelle-Aquitaine